Victor Arthur Kilian (March 6, 1891 – March 11, 1979) was an American actor who was blacklisted by the Hollywood movie studio bosses in the 1950s.

Early life, career, and homicide

Born in Jersey City, New Jersey, Victor Kilian began his career in entertainment at the age of 18 by joining a vaudeville company. In the mid-1920s, he began to perform in Broadway plays and by the end of the decade had made his debut in motion pictures. For the next two decades, he made a good living as a character actor in secondary or minor roles in films such as The Adventures of Tom Sawyer (1938). He was frequently cast as a villain. While staging a fight scene with John Wayne for a 1942 film, Kilian suffered a serious injury that resulted in the loss of one eye.

He was an early resident of Free Acres, a social experimental community developed by Bolton Hall in Berkeley Heights, New Jersey.

During the McCarthyism of the 1950s, Kilian was blacklisted for his political beliefs, but because the Actors' Equity Association refused to go along with the ban, Kilian was able to earn a living by returning to perform on stage. After Hollywood's blacklisting ended, he began doing guest roles on television series during the 1970s. He is best known for his role as Grandpa Larkin (aka The Fernwood Flasher) in the television soap opera spoof Mary Hartman, Mary Hartman (1976). Kilian's wife, Daisy Johnson, to whom he had been married for 46 years, died in 1961.

In 1979, Kilian appeared in an episode of All in the Family, "The Return of Stephanie's Father", portraying a desk clerk in a seedy hotel. In the same episode, fellow veteran Hollywood character actor Charles Wagenheim (1896-1979) appeared as a bum in the hotel's lobby. Just weeks before the episode aired, on March 6, 1979 (Kilian's birthday), the 83 year-old Wagenheim was bludgeoned to death in his Hollywood apartment after confronting his caregiver, Stephanie Boone, whom he accused of stealing from him and forging his signature on checks. Five days later, on March 11, 1979, Kilian, who lived alone in Hollywood just blocks from Wagenheim, also was beaten to death by burglars in his apartment after returning home from grocery shopping.

On March 20, 1979, All in the Family posthumously aired the episode "The Return of Stephanie's Father", with Wagenheim's and Kilian's last screen performances. Victor Kilian's cremated remains were scattered in the rose garden at Westwood Village Memorial Park Cemetery.

Selected filmography

Gentlemen of the Press (1929) - McPhee - Reporter (uncredited)
The Wiser Sex (1932) - Ed
Before Morning (1933) - House Detective (uncredited)
Air Hawks (1935) - Tiny Davis
After the Dance (1935) - Kennedy
Atlantic Adventure (1935) - Joe Brannigan (uncredited)
The Public Menace (1935) - Joe
The Girl Friend (1935) - Sunshine Minton
Bad Boy (1935) - Sid
Riffraff (1936) - "Flytrap"
The Music Goes 'Round (1936) - Marshall
The Road to Glory (1936) - Tall Sergeant
Shakedown (1936) - Caretaker
Blackmailer (1936) - Photographer (uncredited)
Ramona (1936) - Father Gaspara
Adventure in Manhattan (1936) - Mark Gibbs
Banjo on My Knee (1936) - Mr. Slade
Lady from Nowhere (1936) - Zeke Hopper
Fair Warning (1937) - Sam
Seventh Heaven (1937) - Gobin
The League of Frightened Men (1937) - Pitney Scott
It's All Yours (1937) - City Clerk
It Happened in Hollywood (1937) - Slim
Tovarich (1937) - Gendarme
The Adventures of Tom Sawyer (1938) - Sheriff
Gold Diggers in Paris (1938) - Gendarme
Marie Antoinette (1938) - Guard in Louis' Cell (uncredited)
Prison Break (1938) - Fenderson
Passport Husband (1938) - Gangster (uncredited)
Boys Town (1938) - The Sheriff
Orphans of the Street (1938) - Dave Farmer
Fighting Thoroughbreds (1939) - Wilson
Convict's Code (1939) - C.W. Bennett
Paris Honeymoon (1939) - Old Villager a.k.a. The Ancient
St. Louis Blues (1939) - Sheriff Burdick
The Adventures of Huckleberry Finn (1939) - Pap Finn
Never Say Die (1939) - Man Who Loads Pistols (uncredited)
The Return of the Cisco Kid (1939) - Bartender at Stage Stop
Only Angels Have Wings (1939) - Sparks
Blackmail (1939) - Warden Frank Miller (uncredited)
Dust Be My Destiny (1939) - Doc Saunders
The Hunchback of Notre Dame (1939) - Esmeralda's Hangman (uncredited)
Invisible Stripes (1939) - Loading Dock Foreman (uncredited)
Abe Lincoln in Illinois (1940) - Minor Role (uncredited)
Little Old New York (1940) - DeWitt
Young Tom Edison (1940) - Mr. Dingle
Virginia City (1940) - Abraham Lincoln
Dr. Cyclops (1940) - Steve Baker
'Til We Meet Again (1940) - Herb McGillis
King of the Lumberjacks (1940) - Joe (Saloon Owner)
Torrid Zone (1940) - Carlos
Florian (1940) - Junk Man (uncredited)
Out West with the Peppers (1940) - Jim Anderson
All This, and Heaven Too (1940) - Gendarme
The Return of Frank James (1940) - Preacher
City for Conquest (1940) - Bill Poster (uncredited)
Barnyard Follies (1940) - Hiram Crabtree
Tugboat Annie Sails Again (1940) - Sam
They Knew What They Wanted (1940) - The Photographer
The Mark of Zorro (1940) - Boatman (uncredited)
Santa Fe Trail (1940) - Dispatch Rider (uncredited)
Chad Hanna (1940) - Potato Man
Western Union (1941) - Charlie
Blood and Sand (1941) - Priest
Sergeant York (1941) - Andrews (uncredited)
I Was a Prisoner on Devil's Island (1941) - Guissart
Mob Town (1941) - Uncle Lon Barker
Secrets of the Lone Wolf (1941) - Colonel Costals
You're in the Army Now (1941) - Soldier (uncredited)
A Date with the Falcon (1942) - Max Carlson (uncredited)
Reap the Wild Wind (1942) - Mathias Widgeon
This Gun for Hire (1942) - Drew
Atlantic Convoy (1942) - Otto
The Ox-Bow Incident (1943) - Darby
Hitler's Madman (1943) - Janek (uncredited)
Bomber's Moon (1943) - Henryk van Seeler
Johnny Come Lately (1943) - Tramp in Box Car
Five Were Chosen (1944)
Uncertain Glory (1944) - Latour (uncredited)
The Adventures of Mark Twain (1944) - Higgins (uncredited)
Kismet (1944) - Jehan (uncredited)
Barbary Coast Gent (1944) - Curry Slake
Meet Me in St. Louis (1944) - Baggage Man (uncredited)
Dangerous Passage (1944) - Buck Harris, 1st Mate
Belle of the Yukon (1944) - Professor Salsbury
Dillinger - Pa Dillinger (uncredited)
Escape in the Desert (1945) - Rancher (uncredited)
Bedside Manner (1945) - Board Member (uncredited)
Behind City Lights (1945) - Daniel Lowell
Spellbound (1945) - Sheriff (uncredited)
The Spanish Main (1945) - Santa Madre Captain
The Fighting Guardsman (1946) - Montebar (uncredited)
Little Giant (1946) - Gus Anderson (salesman)
Smoky (1946) - J.P. Mingo - Junkman (uncredited)
The Yearling (1946) - Captain (uncredited)
Duel in the Sun (1946) - Gambler (uncredited)
Gentleman's Agreement (1947) - Olsen (uncredited)
Northwest Stampede (1948) - Mel Saunders
Yellow Sky (1948) - Bartender (uncredited)
I Shot Jesse James (1949) - Soapy
Rimfire (1949) - Sheriff Jim Jordan
Colorado Territory (1949) - Missouri Sheriff (uncredited)
The Wyoming Bandit (1949) - Ross Tyler
Reign of Terror (1949) - Jailer (uncredited)
Madame Bovary (1949) - Speaker at Agricultural Show (uncredited)
Stars in My Crown (1950) - Ned (uncredited)
The Flame and the Arrow (1950) - Mazzoni - Apothecary
The Old Frontier (1950) - Judge Ames
The Showdown (1950) - Hemp
No Way Out (1950) - Father (uncredited)
The Return of Jesse James (1950) - Westfield Sheriff Rigby
The Bandit Queen (1950) - Jose Montalvo
One Too Many (1950) - Frank J. Emery
The Lemon Drop Kid (1951) - Mr. Egan - Landlord (uncredited)
Passage West (1951) - Messenger (uncredited)
The Tall Target (1951) - John K. Gannon - Flyer Express Engineer (uncredited)
Unknown World (1951) - Dr. Jeremiah Morley (uncredited)
Face to Face (1952) - Jasper Morgan (segment: "The Bride Comes to Yellow Sky") (uncredited)
The Brady Bunch (1970) - Mr. Stoner (episode: "The Treasure of Sierra Avenue")
The Jeffersons (1975) - Uncle Bertram Willis (episodes: "Uncle Bertram" and "Jenny's Grandparents")
All in the Family (1979) - Mr. Burkvist (episode: "Edith Gets Fired"), clerk (episode: "The Return of Stephanie's Father")

See also

List of unsolved deaths

References

External links

 
 
 
 

1891 births
1979 deaths
1979 murders in the United States
20th-century American male actors
American male film actors
American male stage actors
American people with disabilities
Burials at Westwood Village Memorial Park Cemetery
Deaths by beating in the United States
Hollywood blacklist
Male actors from Jersey City, New Jersey
People from Berkeley Heights, New Jersey
People murdered in Los Angeles
Deaths from head injury
American murder victims
Unsolved murders in the United States
Vaudeville performers